This is a list of California ballot propositions from 1990–1999.

Elections

June 5, 1990

107 – Passed – Housing And Homeless Bond Act Of 1990.
108 – Passed – Passenger Rail And Clean Air Bond Act Of 1990
109 – Passed – Governor's Review Of Legislation. Legislative Deadlines.
110 – Passed – Property Tax Exemption For Severely Disabled Persons.
111 – Passed – The Traffic Congestion Relief And Spending Limitation Act Of 1990.
112 – Passed – State Officials, Ethics, Salaries. Open Meetings.
113 – Passed – Practice Of Chiropractic. Legislative Initiative Amendment.
114 – Passed – Murder Of A Peace Officer. Criminal Penalties. Special Circumstance. Peace Officer Definition.
115 – Passed – Criminal Law.
116 – Passed – Rail Transportation. Bond Act.
117 – Passed – Wildlife Protection.
118 – Failed – Legislature. Reapportionment. Ethics.
119 – Failed – Reapportionment By Commission. Initiative. Constitutional Amendment And Statute.
120 – Passed – New Prison Construction Bond Act Of 1990.
121 – Passed – Higher Education Facilities Bond Act Of June 1990.
122 – Passed – Earthquake Safety And Public Buildings Rehabilitation Bond Act Of 1990.
123 – Passed – 1990 School Facilities Bond Act.

November 6, 1990
124 – Failed – Local Hospital Districts.
125 – Failed – Motor Vehicle Tax. Rail Transit Funding.
126 – Failed – Alcoholic Beverages. Taxes.
127 – Passed – Earthquake Safety. Property Tax Exclusion.
128 – Failed – Environment. Public Health. Bonds.
129 – Failed – Drug Enforcement, Prevention, Treatment, Prisons. Bonds.
130 – Failed – Forest Acquisition. Timber Harvesting Practices. Bond Act.
131 – Failed – Limits On Terms Of Office. Ethics. Campaign Financing.
132 – Passed – Marine Resources. Initiative Constitutional Amendment.
133 – Failed – Drug Enforcement And Prevention. Taxes. Prison Terms.
134 – Failed – Alcohol Surtax.
135 – Failed – Pesticide Regulation.
136 – Failed – State, Local Taxation.
137 – Failed – Initiative And Referendum Process.
138 – Failed – Forestry Programs. Timber Harvesting Practices.
139 – Passed – Prison Inmate Labor. Tax Credit.
140 – Passed – Limits On Terms Of Office, Legislators' Retirement, Legislative Operating Costs.
141 – Failed – Toxic Chemical Discharge. Public Agencies. Legislative Statute.
142 – Passed – Veterans' Bond Act Of 1990.
143 – Failed – Higher Education Facilities Bond Act Of November 1990.
144 – Failed – New Prison Construction Bond Act Of 1990-B.
145 – Failed – California Housing Bond Act Of 1990.
146 – Passed – School Facilities Bond Act Of 1990.
147 – Failed – County Correctional Facility Capital Expenditure And Juvenile Facility Bond Act Of 1990.
148 – Failed – Water Resources Bond Act Of 1990.
149 – Failed – California Park, Recreation, And Wildlife Enhancement Act Of 1990.
150 – Failed – County Courthouse Facility Capital Expenditure Bond Act Of 1990.
151 – Failed – Child Care Facilities Financing Act Of 1990.

June 2, 1992
152 – Passed – School Facilities Bond Act of 1992
153 – Passed – Higher Education Facilities Bond Act of June 1992
154 – Failed – Property Tax Postponement.

November 3, 1992
155 – Passed – 1992 School Facilities Bond Act.
156 – Failed – Passenger Rail and Clean Air Bond Act of 1992.
157 – Failed – Toll Roads and Highways.
158 – Failed – Office of California Analyst.
159 – Failed – Office of the Auditor General.
160 – Passed – Property Tax Exemption.
161 – Failed – Physician-Assisted Death. Terminal Condition.
162 – Passed – Public Employees' Retirement Systems.
163 – Passed – Ends Taxation of Certain Food Products.
164 – Passed – Congressional Term Limits.
165 – Failed – Budget Process. Welfare. Procedural and Substantive Changes.
166 – Failed – Basic Health Care Coverage.
167 – Failed – State Taxes.

November 2, 1993
168 – Failed – Low Rent Housing Projects.
169 – Failed – Budget Implementation.
170 – Failed – Property Taxes. Schools. Development-Fee Limits.
171 – Passed – Property Taxation. Transfer of Base Year Value.
172 – Passed – Local Public Safety Protection and Improvement Act of 1993.
173 – Failed – California Housing and Jobs Investment Bond Act. $185 Million Legislative Bond Act.
174 – Failed – Education. Vouchers.

June 7, 1994
1A – Failed – Earthquake Relief and Seismic Retrofit Bond Act of 1994.
1B – Failed – School Facilities Bond Act of 1994.
1C – Failed – Higher Education Facilities Bond Act of June 1994.
175 – Failed – Renters' Income Tax Credit.
176 – Passed – Taxation: Nonprofit Organizations.
177 – Passed – Property Tax Exemption. Disabled Persons' Access.
178 – Failed – Property Tax Exclusion. Water Conservation Equipment.
179 – Passed – Murder: Punishment.
180 – Failed – Park Lands, Historic Sites, Wildlife and Forest Conservation Bond Act.

November 8, 1994
181 – Failed – Passenger Rail and Clean Air Bond Act of 1994.
182 – Passed by voters, but courts struck it down.
183 – Passed – Recall Elections. State Officers.
184 – Passed – Increased Sentences. Repeat Offenders (Three Strikes)
185 – Failed – Public Transportation Trust Funds. Gasoline Sales Tax. Initiative Statute.
186 – Failed – Health Services. Taxes.
187 – Passed – Illegal Aliens. Ineligibility for Public Services. Verification and Reporting.
188 – Failed – Smoking and Tobacco Products. Local Preemption. Statewide Regulation.
189 – Passed – Bail Exception. Felony Sexual Assault.
190 – Passed – Commission on Judicial Performance.
191 – Passed – Abolish Justice Courts

March 26, 1996
192 – Passed – Seismic Retrofit Bond Act of 1996.
193 – Passed – Property Appraisal. Exception. Grandparent-Grandchild Transfer.
194 – Passed – Prisoners. Joint Venture Program. Unemployment Benefits. Parole.
195 – Passed – Punishment. Special Circumstances. Carjacking. Murder of Juror.
196 – Passed – Punishment for Murder. Special Circumstances. Drive-By Shootings.
197 – Failed – Amendment of the California Wildlife Protection Act of 1990 (Proposition 117). Mountain Lions.
198 – Passed – Elections. Open Primary.
199 – Failed – Limits on Mobilehome Rent Control. Low-Income Rental Assistance. Initiative Statute.
200 – Failed – No-Fault Motor Vehicle Insurance. Initiative Statute.
201 – Failed – Attorneys' Fees. Shareholder Actions. Class Actions.
202 – Failed – Attorneys' Contingent Fees. Limits.
203 – Passed – Public Education Facilities Bond Act of 1996.

November 5, 1996
204 – Passed – Safe, Clean, Reliable Water Supply Act.
205 – Failed – Youthful and Adult Offender Local Facilities Bond Act of 1996.
206 – Passed – Veterans' Bond Act of 1996.
207 – Failed – Attorneys. Fees. Right to Negotiate. Frivolous Lawsuits.
208 – Passed – Campaign Contributions and Spending Limits. Restricts Lobbyists.
209 – Passed – Prohibition Against Discrimination or Preferential Treatment by State and Other Public Entities.
210 – Passed – Minimum Wage Increase.
211 – Failed – Attorney-Client Fee Arrangements. Securities Fraud. Lawsuits.
212 – Failed – Campaign Contributions and Spending Limits. Repeals Gift and Honoraria Limits. Restricts Lobbyists.
213 – Passed – Limitation on Recovery to Felons, Uninsured Motorists, Drunk Drivers.
214 – Failed – Health Care. Consumer Protection. Initiative Statute.
215 – Passed – Compassionate Use Act of 1996. Medical Use of Marijuana.
216 – Failed – Health Care. Consumer Protection. Taxes on Corporate Restructuring.
217 – Failed – Top Income Tax Brackets. Reinstatement. Revenues to Local Agencies.
218 – Passed – Voter Approval for Local Government Taxes. Limitations on Fees, Assessments, and Charges.

June 2, 1998
219 – Passed – Ballot Measures. Application.
220 – Passed – Courts. Superior and Municipal Court Consolidation.
221 – Passed – Subordinate Judicial Officers. Discipline.
222 – Passed – Murder. Peace Officer Victim. Sentence Credits.
223 – Failed – Schools. Spending Limits on Administration.
224 – Failed – State-Funded Design and Engineering Services. Initiative Constitutional Amendment.
225 – Passed – Limiting Congressional Terms. Proposed U.S. Constitutional Amendment.
226 – Failed – Political Contributions by Employees, Union Members, Foreign Entities.
227 – Passed – English Language in Public Schools.

November 3, 1998
1A – Passed – Class Size Reduction Kindergarten-University Public Education Facilities Bond Act of 1998.
1 – Passed – Property Taxes: Contaminated Property.
2 – Passed – Transportation: Funding.
3 – Failed – Partisan Presidential Primary Elections.
4 – Passed – Trapping Practices. Bans Use of Specified Traps and Animal Poisons.
5 – Passed – Tribal-State Gaming Compacts. Tribal Casinos.
6 – Passed – Criminal Law. Prohibition on Slaughter of Horses and Sale of Law. Prohibition on Slaughter of Horses and Sale of Horsemeat for Human Consumption.
7 – Failed – Air Quality Improvement. Tax Credits.
8 – Failed – Public Schools. Permanent Class Size Reduction. Parent- Teacher Councils. Teacher Credentialing. Pupil Suspension for Drug Possession. Chief Inspector's Office.
9 – Failed – Electric Utilities. Assessments. Bonds.
10 – Passed – State and County Early Childhood Development Programs. Additional Tobacco Surtax.
11 – Passed – Local Sales and Use Taxes—Revenue Sharing.

References

1990
Ballot propositions
20th century in law
Ballot propositions, 1990